Kvint is a family name of:

 Helene Kvint (born 1972), a Danish performance artist and actress
 Vladimir Kvint, an economist and strategist

See also 

 Quint (disambiguation)
 KVINT (short for: Kon’iaki, vina i napitki Tiraspol’ia), a wine- and brandy distillery based in Tiraspol

Germanic-language surnames
Danish-language surnames
Russian-language surnames
bg:Квинт
ru:Квинт